Acacia cincinnata, also known as the Daintree wattle or circle fruit salwood, is a species of leguminous trees of the plant family Fabaceae, found naturally in north eastern Australia.

Description
It has furrowed and flaky bark that is dark grey to black in colour. The stout and angular, lightly haired branchlets with a pale brownish grey colour. Like many species of Acacia it has phyllodes rather than true leaves. The flat evergreen phyllodes have a falcate narrowly elliptic shape that tapers gradually towards apex and base. The tree flowers between May and June, producing yellow inflorescences.

Taxonomy
The species was first formally described by the botanist Ferdinand von Mueller in 1878 as part of the work Fragmenta Phytographiae Australiae. It was reclassified as Racosperma cincinnatum in 1987 by Leslie Pedley then transferred back to genus Acacia in 2006.

Distribution
The tree is endemic to Queensland where it is often situated along the margins of rainforest in damper parts of the Atherton Tableland, the Eungella Range and the adjacent coast and in high rainfall areas between Maryborough and Brisbane. The tree is also found along river banks and in open Eucalyptus forest communities usually growing in sandy soils over granite.

See also
 List of Acacia species

References 

cincinnata
Flora of Queensland
Plants described in 1879
Taxa named by Ferdinand von Mueller